Phosphoglucomutase-2 is an enzyme that in humans is encoded by the PGM2 gene. PGM2 is a major isozyme in red blood cells.

References

Further reading